In European elections, Lower Silesian and Opole is a constituency of the European Parliament. It consists of the Lower Silesian Voivodeship and Opole Voivodeship.

Nomenclature 
The relevant Polish legislation ("The Act of 23 January 2004 on Elections to the European Parliament") establishing the constituencies does not give the constituencies formal names. Instead, each constituency has a number, territorial description, and location of the Constituency Electoral Commission. The 2004 Polish National Election Commission and the 2004 European Parliament Election website uses the territorial description when referring to the constituency, not the electoral commission location.

References

External links 
 European Election News by European Election Law Association (Eurela)

European Parliament constituencies in Poland
Lower Silesian Voivodeship
2004 establishments in Poland
Constituencies established in 2004
Opole Voivodeship